Batsch may refer to:

Batsch, taxonomic author abbreviation of August Batsch (1761–1802), German naturalist and authority on mushrooms
Mieczysław Batsch (1900–1977), Polish soccer forward
Bill Batsch (1892–1963), American Major League Baseball player
Batsch affair, 1872 diplomatic incident between Haiti and Germany
Batsch County, alternative name for the former Bács-Bodrog County of the Kingdom of Hungary, now part of Serbia

See also
Basch, a surname
Batch (disambiguation)